Anatoma kopua is a species of minute sea snail, a marine gastropod mollusc or micromollusc in the family Anatomidae.

Distribution
This marine species occurs off New Zealand.

References

External links
 To World Register of Marine Species

Anatomidae
Gastropods described in 2012